Some of Microsoft's early products included hidden Easter eggs.  Microsoft formally stopped including Easter eggs in its programs as part of its Trustworthy Computing Initiative in 2002.

Windows 

Windows 1.0, 2.0 and 2.1 all include an Easter egg which features a window that shows a list of people who worked on the software along with a "Congrats!" button. Double clicking the list box further changes the background of the window to tiled smiley faces. The instructions for invoking the Easter egg vary depending on the version:
 1.xx: Press .
 1.01 and later: Hold  then , release  then , press  twice then press .

This causes the developer credits to appear on the desktop in the form of the email names of the crew.

Windows 3.1 has two visible Easter eggs, both of which reference the Microsoft Bear, which was the mascot of the Windows 3.1 development team. One was the developer credits, where the Bear, along with Bill Gates, Steve Ballmer, and Brad Silverberg, present the email aliases of the Windows 3.1 developers. bradsi, being in charge of Windows production, is listed first; the three other presenters, billg, steveb, and t-bear, appear together in "Special Thanks", the last section of the list. The other one was a reference to a fictitious file named BEAR.EXE in the properties window for the MS-DOS Prompt. Internally, there was another egg, where several internal system functions (although having meaningful internal names) were exported from user.exe as BEARNNN (where NNN is the ordinal number of the function) in his honor and to discourage their use by third-party software developers. Open it again and do so with a different square (with the keys still pressed down). Keep repeating this until the Microsoft Bear appears in the window, as seen to the right.

Windows 95 has an animated presentation of its developers, complete with music. This page is accessed by renaming a folder on the desktop to "and now, the moment you've all been waiting for", then "we proudly present for your viewing pleasure", and finally "The Microsoft Windows 95 Product Team!". Additionally, during the development of Windows 95, the shell developers had several stuffed animals as mascots. In addition to the Microsoft Bear, there were two bunnies as well - the smaller 16-bit Bunny and the larger 32-bit Bunny. The bunnies' names referred to the fact that Windows 95 was the transitional OS. The Microsoft Bunny has an exported function named after him, BUNNY_351 in krnl386.exe. Also, the Bunny is the icon for the Microsoft Party Line (rumor.exe) in some pre-release versions of Windows 95. In the internet mail app, there is a hidden credits list that can be accessed by clicking Help, About, comctl32.dll, and typing MORTIMER.

Windows 98 has a credits screen Easter egg, which can be triggered by invoking weldata.exe with the argument "You_are_a_real_rascal" in the command line or a shortcut (.lnk file), or by clicking and dragging between the locations of Memphis, Egypt; Memphis, Tennessee; and Redmond, Washington on the Time Zone map. (This easter egg is a reference to "Memphis" being the development codename of Windows 98.) 

A drawing of the Microsoft Bear was used as the icon for the SETDEBUG.EXE and JDBGMGR.EXE system files. The odd icon gave credibility to the jdbgmgr.exe virus hoax, which claimed that the files were part of a computer virus. See SULFNBK.EXE for a similar hoax.

The Pipes screensaver in Windows 95 (OSR2 onwards), 98, ME, NT 4.0 and 2000 will occasionally insert a Utah teapot as a joint between pipes when the screensaver is configured to draw multiple, traditional-style pipes with mixed joint types and a solid texture. Windows 2000 and Windows XP have an undocumented texture in the Pipes screensaver (sspipes. scr) that makes the pipes red and white, similar to candy canes.

An Easter egg that displays the names of all the volcanoes in the United States can be found in the 3D Text screensaver on all versions of Microsoft Windows prior to Windows XP by setting the text to display to "Volcano". In Windows NT 3.5, setting the text to "I love NT" shows the names of the developers. "Rock" and "Beer" lists bands and breweries, respectively. In Windows NT 4.0, the phrase to view the developer credits was changed to "not evil". Setting the text to "I love NT" will instead simply display "good?".

Three images are embedded in the surface of Windows Vista's installation DVD. On one of the images shows the faces of the members of Microsoft's anti-piracy team who worked on the hologram.

In Windows 10 build 16232, the "Windows is checking for a solution to solve the problem..." dialog that appears when a program crashes is replaced with "Windows is opening a portal to another dimension..."

Microsoft Office

MS Access 1.0 
Access 1.0 had a simple animation showing a gun firing and killing 2 ducks.  The story behind this is; one of the team spoke with a strong accent and when referring to the main competition 'Paradox' it sounded like "Pair o' Ducks".  The gun killing the ducks is something like what the earlier release date and ridiculously cheap pricing, did to Paradox.  In truth the product was not truly ready for market at the time of the release of 1.0 and it was almost immediately followed up with a free copy of 1.1  for those that could produce evidence of their purchased of 1.0, but the damage had been done to Paradox.  Paradox did eventually come to market, and probably with a better product, but by that time, people looking for an all encompassing, low level application and database development platform, were already using Microsoft Access.

Word for Windows 2 
In Word for Windows 2, there is a simple animation involving a WordPerfect 'Monster', a fireworks display and credits roll in the About box.  The user's name (entered in Tools Options) was appended to the end of the "Thanks" section of the credits.

Office 4.3 

The tip of the day would sometimes display the following fun and inspirational tips. They could also be viewed in the help file. This first appeared in Office 4.3, and also appeared in Office 95, and 97.

If you do your best, whatever happens will be for the best.
Things that go away by themselves can come back by themselves.
Plaid shirts and striped pants rarely make a positive fashion statement.
You should never dive into murky waters.
It's never too late to learn to play the piano.
You can hurt yourself if you run with scissors.
You should never look directly at the sun.
This is the last tip.

Office 95 
 Microsoft Excel contained a hidden Doom-like mini-game called "The Hall of Tortured Souls", a series of rooms featuring the names and faces of the developers.

Office 97 

 Microsoft Excel contained a hidden flight simulator.
 Microsoft Word contained a hidden pinball game.
 Microsoft Access contained a hidden simulation of the Magic 8 Ball toy. This also works in Access 2000.

Office 2000 
Using Microsoft Excel 2000 and the Office Web Components, a small 3-D game called "Dev Hunter" (inspired by Spy Hunter) is accessible. DirectX must be installed for this to work, and the egg is incompatible with certain service pack upgrades. On the roadway shown in this game, a list of comments appear, all capitalized:

WE ARE SPECIAL TOO
YOU WILL RESPECT THE RECTANGLES
DONT SKIMP ON THE DATA
WHAT DO THESE PEOPLE DO AGAIN
SO YOUR NAME IS MISSPELLED WHAT ARE YOU GOING TO DO ABOUT IT
CIRCLES ARE GOOD TOO BUT THEYRE NOT RECTANGLES
PIVOT PIVOT PIVOT CANT GET ENOUGH
MALICIOUS PIXIES
A CHART SAYS SO MUCH EVEN THOUGH IT DOESNT REALLY SAY ANYTHING BECAUSE IT CANT TALK
THANKS FOR SHARING
LAST BUT NOT LEAST BUT ALSO NOT COMPRESSED SPAM

Office 2004 Mac 
The game Asteroids is included in the Microsoft Office Notifications application.

Cortana 

 When asked if she likes Clippy, Cortana would answer "Definitely. He taught me how important it is to listen." or "What's not to like? That guy took a heck of a beating and he's still smiling." Her avatar then occasionally turns into a two-dimensional Metro-style Clippit for several seconds
 Asking Cortana "What does the fox say?" will make her respond with "Ring-ding-ding-ding-dingeringeding", a reference to the 2013 song The Fox
 Cortana has several Easter eggs referencing the Halo franchise including, but not limited to, the questions "What is Halo?", "Tell me about Halo", "Do you love Master Chief?" and "How is Master Chief?"
 Saying "May the force be with you" to Cortana will make her reply "My ally is the force, and a powerful ally it is.", a reference to the Star Wars franchise.
 Asking "What is the airspeed velocity of an unladen swallow?" will make Cortana respond "What do you mean? An African or European swallow?", a reference to Monty Python.
 Saying "up up down down left right left right B A start" to Cortana will make her say that it is the Konami Code, not the Cortana Code.
 Asking Cortana "Who lives in a pineapple under the sea?", will make her respond with "SpongeBob SquarePants!", a reference to the theme song of the 1999 animated series SpongeBob SquarePants.

Gaming 

 In one of the missions of Microsoft Flight Simulator X, called "Secret Shuttle", the player's call sign is changed mid-flight to a one that starts with "Longhorn". After landing at Area 51, a request from another aircraft for departure clearance, whose call sign starts with "Vista" can be heard over the radio. "Longhorn" was the development codename for the then-upcoming Windows Vista operating system, which was released worldwide in 2007. The game was released in 2006.
 The Xbox console contains developer credits in the dashboard. Inserting an audio CD and ripping it with the name "<<Eggsßox>>" would trigger it.
 The Xbox games console contains a hidden, modified sounds of the Apollo space missions of which are conversations that are currently in the public domain. The sounds would only play when the console is idle on the Xbox dashboard for a long period of time.
 A super deformed cartoon depiction of Halo protagonist Master Chief can be seen inside the Xbox One S's plastic casing and on the Xbox One X's motherboard.

Others 
 Typing WAIT6502,1 into a Commodore PET with BASIC V2 (1979) would result in "MICROSOFT!" printed on the top left of the screen, partly overwriting the first line "### COMMODORE BASIC ###".
 In Microsoft QBasic, there is an Easter egg where the developers' names can be seen at start up, printed in colorful text, flying in one letter at a time from every corner.
 Acid1 is included as an offline Easter egg, accessible by typing 'about:tasman', in Internet Explorer 5 for Mac OS with the text replaced by the names of the developers.
 Typing edge://surf into the address bar in Microsoft Edge versions higher than 83 will allow users to play Surf, a game where the player controls a surfer who must collect powerups and run from a kraken. This game bears resemblance to SkiFree, another Microsoft-developed game, and has been compared to Google Chrome's Dinosaur Game.
 In Microsoft Teams 1.5.00.21668 (32 bit), typing (Windows) will cause a green dinosaur to appear.

Features often mistaken for Easter eggs
The following are not Easter eggs, but rather features unexpected by many users of Microsoft products.

Microsoft Word 
Every version of Microsoft Word from 97 to 2016 (Windows) or 2004 to 2011 (Mac) contain functions to create filler text. On older versions, typing    =rand()    in a Word document and hitting Enter results in 3 paragraphs of 5 repetitions of the pangram "The quick brown fox jumps over the lazy dog". Typing    =rand(X,Y)    (with numbers for X and Y) results in X paragraphs of Y repetitions of the sentence. For example, =rand(10,10) will produce ten paragraphs, each with ten repetitions. Microsoft has officially described this as a feature and not an Easter egg.
In Microsoft Word 2007 and 2010, the repeated sentence is replaced with a longer text:

In Microsoft Word 2013, the text was replaced again with

When =rand(1,1) is written, only a simple sentence is shown: in English, it is "On the Insert tab, the galleries include items that are designed to coordinate with the overall look of your document."

In Word 2007, 2010, 2013, 2016, 2019 and online, the pangram "The quick brown fox jumps over the lazy dog" text is available by typing the command =rand.old() and pressing enter.

Additionally, typing =lorem() gives the following text:

Lorem ipsum dolor sit amet, consectetur adipiscing elit. Maecenas porttitor congue massa. Fusce posuere, magna sed pulvinar ultricies, purus lectus malesuada libero, sit amet commodo magna eros quis urna. Nunc viverra imperdiet enim. Fusce est. Vivamus a tellus. Pellentesque habitant morbi tristique senectus et netus et malesuada fames ac turpis egestas. Proin pharetra nonummy pede. Mauris et orci.

Typing =lorem(N) will produce "N" (where N is an integer) lines of lorem ipsum text. When "N" is larger than 27, the function begins to repeat itself.

All of these features will be disabled when "Replace text as you type" is turned off.

In Microsoft Word 2021, when dark mode is enabled, the picture icon in the insert tab replaces the sun with a moon.

Microsoft Windows 
 In Microsoft Windows, it is not possible to create or rename a file or folder called CON (case insensitive). This has been subject to a hoax that claims Microsoft is unable to explain why. In reality, however, CON, along with PRN, AUX, COM# (where # is a digit) and NUL, are reserved device names.
 There were features needed to be turned on while Windows 95 was Beta tested. Some of the desktop features, including full window drag and anti-aliased fonts, could be turned on by placing the line ILOVEBUNNY32=1 under the Windows section in win.ini. The features were later sold in the Microsoft Plus! for Windows 95 add-on. 
 DeskBar was a feature Microsoft planned to introduce in Windows 98. This would allow users to download desktop toolbars (deskbars) from their favorite websites. These mini-toolbars could update themselves automatically at predefined times, supplying the latest information from the websites without the need to launch a web browser. Microsoft did implement this feature in Windows 98 beta builds, but webmasters showed little interest and the feature was subsequently hidden in the Windows 98 RTM version.
  Windows includes a number of MIDI files for troubleshooting purposes. In Windows 3.1, PASSPORT.MID and CANYON.MID (by George Stone) can be found in the directory <drive>:\Windows\Media, with some .WAV and .RMI files. Windows 95 contains CLOUDS.MID (by Brian Orr), which plays in a hidden credits sequence. In Windows ME and later versions, these were replaced by ONESTOP.MID (composed by David Yackley), FLOURISH.MID, and TOWN.MID (both by Nathan Grigg). These files allows for product support technicians to diagnose problems with MIDI playback without requiring the user to go to a Web page and download a known-good MIDI file. FLOURISH.MID was also used by DirectX Diagnostic Tool 9.0 (included in dxdiagn.dll and replaced DXDIAG.MID which was included in older versions) to test DirectMusic. CSSAMP1.MID can also appear if Canon drivers are installed.
 In Windows XP, a music file titled title.wma (an environmental mix by Stan LePard.) is found in \WINDOWS\system32\oobe\images folder. (OOBE stands for Out-of-box experience.) The file metadata calls it "Windows Welcome music by Microsoft". This is the background music played during the initial configuration wizard used to perform tasks such as setting up user accounts the first time that a new installation of Windows XP is used. In Windows Server 2003 and some builds of Longhorn, title.wma is instead replaced by the song No Hay Problema, produced by Oregon-based band Pink Martini. The original Windows XP version was believed to be composed by Brian Eno, but it was proven false since it was previously used in Internet Starter Kit 3.
 Since Windows 95, a utility called Phone Dialer is available that allows one to place a call through one's phone port, provided they have one on their computer. There are no Start menu shortcuts for it and one must run its executable file (dialer.exe) directly. This was only documented in Windows 95 and Windows 98.
 In the Pinball game included with Windows, typing "hidden test" when the game is active starts test mode. In this mode, the user can drag the ball with the mouse cursor, and can press H to instantly get a high score, R to increase rank, M to display system memory, and Y to show frame rate. Typing "1max" at the start of a new ball awards an extra ball. Similarly, the user can type "gmax" to activate the gravity well, "rmax" to go up a rank, and "bmax" for unlimited balls (this last one results in an endless game, thereby precluding activation of the other cheats until the game is restarted).
 In the early versions of the Minesweeper game, if the user starts the game, types "xyzzy", and presses  simultaneously, the top left-most pixel of the monitor (not the window) will be white or black when the mouse is hovered above a square, indicating that the square is either safe or mined, respectively. The first click anywhere in Minesweeper is never a mine. A click on a 'black' square, as first click, moves that mine away.
 Starting with Windows Vista, the Windows Master Control Panel shortcut, colloquially known as "God Mode", is commonly mistaken for an Easter egg. Creating a folder that references a specific global unique identifier allows for the creation of a shortcut to a location; in the case of "God Mode" (GodMode.{ED7BA470-8E54-465E-825C-99712043E01C) it creates a Control Panel applet with all control panel items view (more than 200) enabled.

See also

List of Easter eggs in Tesla products
List of Google Easter eggs

References

Microsoft software
Computer humor
In-jokes
Easter egg (media)